Amelogenin, Y isoform is a protein that in humans is encoded by the AMELY gene. AMELY is located on the Y chromosome and encodes a form of amelogenin. Amelogenin is an extracellular matrix protein involved in biomineralization during tooth enamel development.

Clinical significance 
Mutations in the related AMELX gene on the X chromosome cause X-linked amelogenesis imperfecta.

References

External links

Further reading

Genes on human chromosome Y
Genetics